Everybody Dies But Me (Vse umrut, a ya ostanus) is a 2008 Russian coming-of-age drama film directed by Valeriya Gai Germanika and starring Agniya Kuznetsova, Polina Filonenko and Olga Shuvalova.

Plot
Taglines: "Being a girl is hard"; "Not so child games"

Three lower-class Moscow high school friends, Katya, Vika and Janna, learn that there will be a school disco on the coming Saturday night. They start preparations to what seems to be the most important moment in their life.

Production
The film depicts issues of child alcoholism and violence in Russia. In order to appear more realistic, the actors consumed large quantities of alcohol and tobacco on camera, performed fight scenes without stunts and used many mat profanities. However, the main protagonists were all played by adult professional actors.

Awards
2009 Nika Award ("Young Talent Discovery of the Year" nomination)
2008 Cannes Film Festival: Prix Regards Jeune (young cinematographer award) and special mention in the Caméra d'Or (best feature film award) 
CineVision award of the Munich Film Festival
26 Brussels International Film Festival – «Best Actress» award for the three lead actresses

Notes

External links

film's official page - on the PROFIT studio web site

Review in Variety

2008 films
Russian coming-of-age drama films
2000s coming-of-age drama films
2000s Russian-language films
Films set in Moscow
2008 drama films